The 1919 Schaumburg-Lippe state election was held on 16 February 1919 to elect the 15 members of the Landtag of the Free State of Schaumburg-Lippe.

References 

Schaumburg-Lippe
Elections in Lower Saxony